Institute of Management in Kerala (IMK) is a management institute in India under the University of Kerala. It is a government institution established in the year 1991. The institute is located near the international business hub of Kerala, “The Technopark” Thiruvananthapuram. Amidst the lush green Karyavattom University Campus, the institute is a part of the School of Business Management and Legal Studies of the University              IMK has strong strength with an intake of close to 100 students every year. IMK strives to achieve quality discussions in the realm of business management and shapes a new generation of competent managers. Institute of Management in Kerala is one among the oldest and prestigious B-Schools in India. 
IMK offers: 
 Four Semester MBA-General Programme 
 Four Semester MBA- Travel &  Tourism Programme 
 Four  Semester MBA- Evening Programme 
 Doctoral & Post- Doctoral Programmes

Structure
Institute of Management in Kerala (IMK) established in 1991 
under the University of Kerala is one of the 41 teaching department of Kerala University, situated in its two campuses namely 
 Kariavattom campus (includes majority of the teaching departments and is situated just opposite to the Greenfield stadium) 
 Palayam Campus ( includes the senate house and a few other teaching departments)

senior prof. K S Chandrasekar, is the head of the institute. It offers MBA, MBA General, MBA Tourism, MBA Evening, and doctoral programs. Formerly, there were 8 IMK's. But from the year 2013, there is only 1 IMK as the teaching department of university of kerala at Karyavattom campus, Thiruvananthapuram. Remaining IMK's has been renamed to University Institute of Management (UIM).

IMK, Karyavattom, Thiruvananthapuram
UIM, Poojapura (ICM Poojapura)
UIM, Adoor 
UIM, Kollam 
UIM, Kundara 
UIM, Varkala 
UIM, Alapuzha
UIM, Punalur

References

External links
 IMK Website

Business schools in Thiruvananthapuram
Educational institutions established in 1991
Colleges affiliated to the University of Kerala
1991 establishments in Kerala